Bestman: 4 Better, Not 4 Worse is a 2002 Filipino comedy film directed by Tony Y. Reyes. The film stars Michael V. and Ogie Alcasid.

Cast
 Ogie Alcasid as Billy
 Michael V. as Joey
 Michelle Bayle as Gracia
 Nikki Valdez as May
 Redford White as Carlos Miguel
 Andrea del Rosario as Rosa
 Long Mejia as Ritchie
 Al Arayata as Sunshine
 Yoyong Martirez as Yoyong
 Wally Bayola as Kaka
 Whitney Tyson as Assunta de Roces
 Minnie Aguilar as Mamasan
 Rudy Meyer as Mayor
 Danny Labra as Arroyo

References

External links

2002 films
2002 comedy films
Filipino-language films
Philippine comedy films
OctoArts Films films
Maverick Films films
Films directed by Tony Y. Reyes